Faurea rochetiana, also known as the broad-leaved beechwood, is a tree found in much of Africa from Sudan south to Limpopo, Mpumalanga and northern KwaZulu-Natal. The tree is small and leafy. It has wider leaves, larger flowers and flower veins and also denser hairy twigs than the bushveld beechwood. The tree's national number is 76.

References 

rochetiana
Flora of Africa
Plants described in 1950